Poul Müller (31 December 1909 – 15 September 1979) was a Danish film actor. He appeared in 44 films between 1936 and 1977. He was born in Copenhagen, Denmark and died in Denmark.

Filmography

Millionærdrengen - 1936
Flådens blå matroser - 1937
Frihed, lighed og Louise - 1944
Den usynlige hær - 1945
Sikken en nat - 1947
Mosekongen - 1950
Det sande ansigt - 1951
Dorte - 1951
Avismanden - 1952
To minutter for sent - 1952
Adam og Eva - 1953
 This Is Life (1953)
Hendes store aften - 1954
Himlen er blå - 1954
Vores lille by - 1954
Blændværk - 1955
Der kom en dag - 1955
Færgekroen - 1956
Jeg elsker dig - 1957
Bundfald - 1957
Tre piger fra Jylland - 1957
Ung kærlighed - 1958
Tro, håb og trolddom - 1960
Een blandt mange - 1961
Sorte Shara - 1961
To skøre ho'der - 1961
Duellen - 1962
Rikki og mændene - 1962
Det tossede paradis - 1962
Vi voksne - 1963
Jensen længe leve - 1965
En ven i bolignøden - 1965
Utro - 1966
På'en igen Amalie - 1973
Nyt legetøj - 1977

References

External links

1909 births
1979 deaths
Danish male film actors
Male actors from Copenhagen
20th-century Danish male actors